Yidlife Crisis is a webTV comedy series starring Jamie Elman and Eli Batalion and launched in 2014.

Background 
The comedians of the show grew up together and studied Yiddish at Bialik High School in Côte Saint-Luc in the suburbs of Montreal. Eli Batalion's elders spoke Yiddish at home.

The show launched on YouTube in September 2014. The duo decided to make this show in a move to do something related to their Judaism. In April 2022, the show premiered its first episode in French.

Description 
Yidlife crisis consists of short comedy sketches about two 30-something Jewish friends. Most of the dialog is in Yiddish, which the two use as a secret language, but subtitles are provided in English and French. The show evolves around the 21st century Jewish culture, and sometimes tackles topics such as antisemitism, Jewish food, Christmas versus Hanukkah or marijuana with a typical Yiddish satire. The comedians were directly inspired by the sitcom Seinfeld.

The slogan of the show is "Sex, Drugs, and Milk & Meat. In Yiddish". The series is humorously rated Chai (18 and over) and gathered 200,000 views on YouTube for its first season. Originally, Jamie Elman does not speak Yiddish (he speaks Hebrew), but he learned the phonetics in four days to act as if he did.

Characters 

 Chaimi (Jamie Elman)
 Leyzer (Eli Batalion)

Mayim Bialik featured in one episode.

Live performance 
A live Yidlife crisis show was performed at Montreal's Segal Centre for Performing Arts for a week in January 2022 in front of an empty audience and broadcast online due to pandemic restrictions. The duo also performed in Krakow, Tel Aviv, Toronto, Montreal, Los Angeles and Birmingham (England).

Awards 
 2015: Best comedy series at Toronto's WebFest
 2016: Canadian Screen Award nomination
 2016: Recipients of the Natan Fund ($40,000)

See also 
 Jewish humor

References

External links 
 
 Official website

2014 web series debuts
Canadian comedy web series
Comedy-related YouTube channels
Yiddish culture in Canada
Yiddish-language mass media
Jewish comedy and humor
Ashkenazi Jewish culture in Montreal
Comedians from Montreal
Canadian comedy duos
Secular Jewish culture in Canada